Moise Joseph (born 27 December 1981 in Florida, United States) is a Haitian middle-distance runner specializing in the 800 meters. He competed at the 2004 Olympic Games in Athens, placing sixth in his heat and getting eliminated.  He competed again at the 2012 Olympic Games, but was again eliminated in the heats.

Running career

High school
Born in Miami, Joseph attended Miami Central High School until he graduated in 2000. There he was coached by John A. Rolle, and ended up recording personal bests of 1:50.30 in the 800 meters, 4:10.85 in the 1600 meters, and 9:21.43 in the 3200 meters.

Collegiate
Joseph was recruited to University of Florida, where he specialized in the 800 meters. He qualified for three consecutive NCAA finals in 2002, 2003, and 2004, the best result of which was a third-place finish in the men's 800 final in 2002. In his senior year at Florida, he qualified for the 2004 Summer Olympics and went on to compete for Haiti.

Personal bests
Outdoors
800m 1:45.74 (Baton Rouge 2002)
1000m 2:19.06 (New York 2005)
1500m 3:45.54 (Starkville 2002)

Indoors
800m 1:47.56 (Karlsruhe 2006)
1500m 3:45.93 (New York 2011)

Achievements

References

External links

1981 births
Living people
Haitian male middle-distance runners
Athletes (track and field) at the 2004 Summer Olympics
Athletes (track and field) at the 2012 Summer Olympics
Athletes (track and field) at the 2007 Pan American Games
Athletes (track and field) at the 2011 Pan American Games
Olympic athletes of Haiti
Pan American Games competitors for Haiti
World Athletics Championships athletes for Haiti
Track and field athletes from Miami
American sportspeople of Haitian descent
Competitors at the 2006 Central American and Caribbean Games
Competitors at the 2010 Central American and Caribbean Games
Competitors at the 2014 Central American and Caribbean Games
Central American and Caribbean Games silver medalists for Haiti
Central American and Caribbean Games medalists in athletics